Sevilay İmamoğlu Öcal (born Sevilay İmamoğlu October 7, 1984 in Lüleburgaz, Kırklareli Province) is a Turkish female handballer in the goalkeeper position. She is a member of the Turkish national team. She studied physical education and sports at the Gazi University in Ankara.

Before Sevilay Imamoğlu Öcal transferred to the Muratpaşa Bld. SK at Antalya in July 2011, she played for İzmir Büyükşehir Belediyesi SK, Ankara Havelsan, Üsküdar Belediyespor and Kastamonu G. MSK, where she began her professional career. She was forced to move to the goalkeeper position while she was playing as left winger at the Üsküdar Belediyespor when their goalkeeper left.

Achievements
Mediterranean Games
 2009 

Women's EHF Challenge Cup
 2011-12 

Turkish Women's Handball Super League
 2003-2004  with Üsküdar Belediyespor
 2011-2012  with Muratpaşa Bld. SK

Awards
 2005 Mediterranean Games - Top Goalkeeper

References 

1984 births
Living people
People from Lüleburgaz
Turkish female handball players
Gazi University alumni
Üsküdar Belediyespor players
İzmir Büyükşehir Belediyespor handball players
Muratpaşa Bld. SK (women's handball) players
Mediterranean Games silver medalists for Turkey
Competitors at the 2005 Mediterranean Games
Competitors at the 2009 Mediterranean Games
Mediterranean Games medalists in handball
21st-century Turkish women